Yankie can refer to:
 Yankee, slang for a person of United States origin, or specifically from northern US or New England
 Yankie bar, a Danish chocolate bar confectionery

See also
 Yankee (disambiguation)